Dr. Karl Malus is a fictional mad scientist and criminal appearing in American comic books published by Marvel Comics. He played a part in the origins of Armadillo, Hornet, Falcon II, and many other characters.

Dr. Karl Malus appeared in the second season of the Marvel Cinematic Universe television series Jessica Jones, portrayed by Callum Keith Rennie.

Publication history

Malus first appeared in Spider-Woman #30 (Sept. 1980) and was created by Michael Fleisher, Steve Leialoha and Jim Mooney. He was featured several times opposite of Captain America and Sam Wilson as Captain America. He was also briefly a member of the Frightful Four.

Fictional character biography
Karl Malus was born in Mud Butte, South Dakota. He became a surgeon and researcher. He was later the founder of the Institute for Supranormality Research and became a criminal scientist.

In his first appearance, Malus was performing illegal medical experiments on human beings, funded by the criminal Enforcer, to find out more about superhumans and their abilities. He was approached by the Human Fly, a supervillain who was losing his powers. Malus sent the Human Fly to steal some equipment, attracting the attention of the original Spider-Woman. Since Spider-Woman's friend Scotty McDowell had been rendered comatose by one of the Enforcer's poison bullets, Malus offered to cure McDowell in exchange for leniency. Spider-Woman agreed, but while curing McDowell, Malus also experimented on him using Human Fly's DNA, which would later cause McDowell to transform into the villainous Hornet. Malus went to prison, but was released to "help" authorities against the threat of the Hornet. In actuality, he wanted to capture and study Spider-Woman. Malus slipped away and made contact with the Hornet, whom he kept drugged and aggressive for his own purposes.

Malus then contacted Jack Russell, a man cursed with lycanthropy, and told him he could help cure his transformations into a werewolf. Instead, he placed a control collar on Russell and sent both Hornet and the Werewolf after Spider-Woman. She was able to defeat both of them and freed the Werewolf, who then attacked Malus.

Malus had studied the bizarre criminal Daddy Longlegs, who had gained his powers from a modified growth-serum used by Black Goliath and had thus acquired a sample of Pym Particles, which could alter a person's size and mass. With this knowledge, Malus hoped to restore the powers of Erik Josten. He gave Josten growth powers and enhanced strength, turning him into the supervillain Goliath, but Goliath rejected Malus' offer of partnership and was in turn defeated by the West Coast Avengers.

Malus also transformed Antonio Rodriguez into the Armadillo by combining his human genes with the genetic material of an armadillo. Malus encountered Captain America soon after that.

Eventually, Malus went to work for the Power Broker Curtiss Jackson, using his technology to augment the strength of paying customers to superhuman levels. The strength augmenting process was tremendously risky with half the subjects dying or becoming severely deformed, but this information was kept a closely guarded secret. Power Broker and Malus also used highly addictive drugs on their subjects, telling them that the chemical was necessary to stabilize their powers, but in fact it only served to keep the subjects working for—and paying—the Power Broker. One such victim was Sharon Ventura, who was also sexually abused while drugged. Many wrestlers of the Unlimited Class Wrestling Federation, which is only open to those with super-strength, have used the Power Broker's services and wound up indebted to them.

Malus soon almost strength-augmented Captain America, but was overpowered by D-Man. He escaped with Captain America from the sealed Power Broker laboratory, but was captured by the Night Shift.

When Power Broker, Inc. was attacked by the vigilante known as Scourge of the Underworld, Curtiss Jackson was exposed to his own augmentation device to try to gain super-strength to defend himself. The process went awry, leaving him so grotesquely muscle-bound that he could not move. Malus decided to take advantage of this situation by using Bludgeon and Mangler to abduct Vagabond. Malus sent Vagabond, who knew Jackson, to obtain a copy of his fingerprints so that Malus could access all of Jackson's personal accounts and vaults. He used an explosive wristband to force Vagabond's cooperation, but she managed to knock Malus out, destroy the fingerprint mold, place the band on his wrist, and inject him with the drug he had planned to use on her.

Malus then attempted to learn the secret of Daredevil's prowess and Madcap's invulnerability. Malus fought Hawkeye alongside Triphammer, Pick-Axe, Vice, and Handsaw.

The Power Broker had Malus' legs broken for his betrayal, then promptly re-hired him to try to cure the Power Broker's condition. Malus captured and experimented on several augmented individuals to perfect the de-augmentation process, including Battlestar, which drew the involvement of the U.S. Agent. Together, Battlestar and the Agent freed the captured wrestlers and forced Malus to restore their strength. The U.S. Agent then destroyed Malus' equipment and records.

Malus has since worked for a variety of criminal organizations, including the Corporation, and the Maggia. He even worked with the Avengers and the Thunderbolts in their efforts to defeat Count Nefaria in exchange for a reduced sentence.

During the "Dark Reign" storyline, Karl Malus was researched by Quasimodo as part of its work for Norman Osborn. Quasimodo stated that he would come in handy creating villains and "heroes" for Norman to use.

Karl Malus was recruited by the Wizard to become a new member of the Frightful Four, only to find himself being forcibly made the new host of the Carnage Symbiote. He was eaten by Carnage, who was possessing Wizard at the time.

As part of the "All-New, All-Different Marvel", Karl Malus returned following his devouring by Carnage. Malus explained that he was indeed eaten by Carnage, but somehow was able to pull himself back together once deposited as waste. As a human/Symbiote hybrid, Malus now exhibits symbiote-like abilities and behavior. Since this incident, he continued his experiments on humans as an employee of Serpent Solutions as seen in their flashback. Most of Karl Malus' experiments were on illegal immigrants that were given to him by the Sons of the Serpent upon apprehending them at the Mexican border. The experiments he performed on them turned them into animal hybrids. When Captain America tracked down his operation, Karl Malus used his symbiotic abilities to subdue Captain America and experiment on him, which turned Captain America into a werewolf. Using Redwing's DNA, Karl Malus turned a Mexican teenager named Joaquin Torres into a bird/human hybrid. Upon being liberated by Misty Knight, Captain America followed and subdued Karl Malus by using Redwing's high-pitched sounds on him and remanded him to S.H.I.E.L.D. custody. While Captain America and the others that were experimented upon by Karl Malus were restored to normal, Joaquin was unable to be restored to normal due to Redwing's DNA being vampiric, which granted him a healing factor.

Powers and abilities
Dr. Karl Malus possesses a gifted intellect. He has an MD specializing in surgery and a master's degree in biochemistry. Malus is a brilliant surgeon with a great knowledge of chemistry, genetic manipulation, and radiology.

Following his ingestion by Carnage, Malus has gained the ability to mimic the powers and weaknesses of alien symbiote creatures.

In other media
Dr. Karl Malus appears in the second season of Jessica Jones, portrayed by Callum Keith Rennie. This version is one of several doctors who runs IGH, a biotech clinic specializing in state-of-the-art reconstructive surgery. Years prior, when Jessica Jones and her mother Alisa are critically injured in a car accident, Malus arranged for them to be transferred to his clinic so he could save them. Jessica was released after three weeks while Alisa's recovery took several years as she suffered more extensive damage. Over the course of treating her, Malus developed romantic feelings for Alisa, going so far as to cover up her accidentally killing of one of his nurses by framing a janitor for it and eventually marrying her. When Trish Walker begins investigating IGH in the present, Malus allows Alisa to murder the clinic's subjects and associates. Jessica later spots Malus and Alisa at an aquarium, though they escape. Malus and Jessica get into an argument, with the former claiming he truly loves Alisa despite her condition before fleeing after the mother and daughter argue and fight. After Jessica turns in Alisa, she tracks down Malus again and manages to convince him to work with her to permanently end his work so Alisa can find peace. However, Trish abducts him in an attempt to force him to give her superpowers similar to Jessica's, but Jessica foils the procedure before it can be finished. Not wanting to kill Malus, Jessica spares him. With nothing left to live for, Malus commits suicide by destroying his lab.

References

External links
 
 

Characters created by Jim Mooney
Characters created by Michael Fleisher
Characters created by Steve Leialoha
Comics characters introduced in 1980
Fictional biochemists
Fictional characters from South Dakota
Fictional geneticists
Fictional mad scientists
Fictional surgeons
Marvel Comics male supervillains
Marvel Comics scientists